Saffron Insurance is a regional insurance broker with branches across East Anglia. The business deals with both personal and commercial lines insurance and currently controls some £28m gross written premium (GWP).

Services

Saffron Insurance was established in 1954. It is a UK insurance broker based in Saffron Walden, Essex. They offer a range of insurance products, such as car insurance, home insurance, travel insurance, motorbike insurance, van insurance, property owners insurance, motor trade insurance, motor fleet insurance etc.

In July 2011 Saffron Insurance joined Brokerability, a club of independent brokers. The combined group of brokers controls a GWP in excess of £450m.

In the sixth addition of the Top 100 Independent Brokers supplement, published by the Insurance Age, Saffron Insurance is listed in the top 70.

References

External links
Official website

Financial services companies established in 1954
Insurance companies of the United Kingdom